The 2003–04 Czech Cup was the eleventh season of the annual football knock-out tournament of the Czech Republic.

Teams

Preliminary round

|}

Round 1

|}

Round 2

|}

Round 3

|}

Round 4

|}

Quarterfinals

|}

Semifinals

|}

Final

See also
 2003–04 Czech First League
 2003–04 Czech 2. Liga

References

External links
 Official site 
 Czech Republic Cup 2003/04 at RSSSF.com

2003–04
2003–04 domestic association football cups
Cup